Since its founding in 1625 by Dutch traders as New Amsterdam, New York City has been a major destination for immigrants of many nationalities who have formed ethnic enclaves, neighborhoods dominated by one ethnicity.  Freed African American slaves also moved to New York City in the Great Migration and the later Second Great Migration and formed ethnic enclaves.  These neighborhoods are set apart from the main city by differences such as food, goods for sale, or even language.  Ethnic enclaves provide inhabitants security in work and social opportunities, but limit economic opportunities, do not encourage the development of English speaking, and keep immigrants in their own culture.

, there are 3.1 million immigrants in New York City. This accounts for 37% of the city population and 45% of its workforce. Ethnic enclaves in New York include Caribbean, Asian, European, Latin American, Middle Eastern and Jewish groups, who immigrated from or whose ancestors immigrated from various countries. As many as 800 languages are spoken in New York, making it the most linguistically diverse city in the world.

History of immigration to and ethnic enclaves in New York City
New York City was founded in 1625, by Dutch traders as New Amsterdam. The settlement was a slow growing village, but was diverse. However, the Netherlands never had a large emigrant population, and the colony attracted few Dutch and more people from different ethnic groups.  As early as 1646, 18 languages were spoken in New Amsterdam, and ethnic groups within New Amsterdam included Dutch, Danes, English, Flemish, French, Germans, Irish, Italians, Norwegians, Poles, Portuguese, Scots, Swedes, Walloons, and Bohemians.  The young, diverse village also became a seafarer's town, with taverns and smugglers.  After Peter Stuyvesant became Director, New Amsterdam began to grow more quickly, achieving a population of 1,500, and growing to 2,000 by 1655 and almost to 9,000 in 1664, when the British seized the colony, renaming it New York.

Colonial New York City was also a center of religious diversity, including one of the first Jewish congregations, along with Philadelphia, Savannah, and Newport, in what was to become the United States.

African American and Afro Caribbean

African American

The first recorded African Americans were brought to the present-day United States in 1619 as slaves.  In 1780, under British occupation, New York City had approximately 10,000 freed people of African descent, the largest concentration of such people in North America. New York State began emancipating slaves in 1799, and in 1841, all slaves in New York State were freed, and many of New York's emancipated slaves lived in or moved to Fort Greene, Brooklyn.  All slaves in the United States were later freed in 1865, with the end of the American Civil War and the ratification of the Thirteenth Amendment.  After the Civil War, African Americans left the South, where slavery had been the strongest, in large numbers.  These movements are now known as the Great Migration, during the 1910s and 1920s and the Second Great Migration, from the end of World War II until 1970.

After arriving in New York, the African Americans formed neighborhoods, partially due to racism of the landlords at the time.  The socioeconomic center of these neighborhoods, and all of "Black America", was Harlem, in Northern Manhattan. Hamilton Heights, on Harlem's western side, was a nicer part of Harlem, and Sugar Hill, named because its inhabitants enjoyed the "sweet life", was the nicest part.

In the 1930s, after the Independent Subway System's Eighth Avenue and Fulton Street subways opened, Harlem residents began to leave crowded Harlem for Brooklyn.  The first neighborhood African Americans moved to in large numbers was Bedford-Stuyvesant, composed of the neighborhoods Bedford, Stuyvesant, Weeksville (which had an established African American community by the time of the New York Draft Riots), and Ocean Hill.  From Bedford-Stuyvesant, African Americans moved into the surrounding neighborhoods, including Crown Heights, East New York and Brownsville.  After World War II, "white flight" occurred, in which predominantly white residents moved to the suburbs and were replaced with minority residents. Neighborhoods that experienced this include Canarsie, Flatbush, and East Flatbush.

Queens also experienced "white flight". Jamaica and South Jamaica both underwent ethnic change.  Some of Queens' African American neighborhoods are housing projects or housing cooperatives, such as Queensbridge and LeFrak City.  Other African American neighborhoods include Laurelton, Cambria Heights, Hollis, Springfield Gardens, and St. Albans.

The Bronx experienced white flight, which was mostly confined to the South Bronx and mostly in the 1970s.

Staten Island is home to the oldest continuously settled free-black community in the United States, Sandy Ground. This community along the Southwestern shore of Staten Island was once home to thousands of free-black men and women, who came to Staten Island to work as oystermen. Members of this community also settled and established communities on the North Shore, such as West New Brighton and Port Richmond after oyster fishing became scarce in 1916. Many African Americans settled in several North Shore communities during the Great Migration, such as Arlington, Mariners Harbor, and New Brighton. Although the black community of Staten Island is mostly dispersed throughout the North Shore of the Island, there are several African Americans living on the South Shore.

Ghanaian
Many Ghanaian people have settled in Concourse Village in the Bronx since an influx of Ghanaians began in the 1980s and 1990s. With over 27,000 in New York City, Ghanaians are the city's largest African immigrant group. Most live in the Bronx, Queens, and Brooklyn. In Concourse Village, the intersection of Sheridan Avenue and McClellan Street is considered the Ghanaian population's center of commerce, but people also socialize in this intersection.

West African
There is at least one community of West Africans in New York, concentrated in Le Petit Senegal in Harlem, Manhattan.  The enclave is situated on 116th Street between St. Nicholas and 8th Avenues, and is home to a large number of Francophone West Africans.
 
An enclave of Liberians developed in Staten Island at the end of the 20th century, following the turbulent Liberian Civil War.

Caribbean American

According to the 2010 US Census data on brooklyn.com there are approximately 370,000 (16.4%) Caribbean descendants in Brooklyn. That figure includes persons who identify as Dominican (3.3%), but does not include the (7.4%) Puerto Rican population. Including Puerto Ricans, there are approximately 560,000 (23.8%) persons of Caribbean descent in Brooklyn. Similar, but not identical demographics in America exist in Miami, but there are fewer people of Cuban descent in New York.

Guyanese, Surinamese, Jamaica, and Trinidadian
New York City has large Guyanese, Surinamese, and Trinidadian communities, which not only includes Afro-Caribbeans, but also Indo-Caribbeans, Indo-Guyanese, Indo-Surinamese, Indo-Jamaican, and Indo-Trinidadian (Indo-Caribbean Americans).  The largest one is in Ozone Park, Queens, on the area located in between 101st and Liberty Avenues; this neighborhood extends to Richmond Hill, along Liberty Avenue between Lefferts Boulevard and the Van Wyck Expressway. Guyanese and Trinidadians in New York City number around 227,582 .

Afro-Guyanese, Afro-Surinamese and Afro-Trinidadians live in neighborhoods like Canarsie or Flatbush in Brooklyn. However, majority of the Jamaican population is Black, as Indo-Jamaicans form an extremely small minority.

Indo-Guyanese, Indo-Jamaican, and, Indo-Surinamese, Indo-Trinidadians originated in India. After the abolition of slavery, and formerly enslaved Blacks refused to continue working for their former owners on the plantations, South Asians were brought to Guyana, Suriname, Jamaica, Trinidad and Tobago, and other parts of the Caribbean to work as indentured servants. These South Asians were mostly Hindu, but there were also Muslims, and Christians who were brought from India. A majority of these South Asians spoke Bhojpuri or Caribbean Hindustani. The descendants of these indentured servants later immigrated to New York City and to other places around the world, such as Toronto. In NYC, they mostly live in Richmond Hill and Ozone Park, which have many Hindu, Muslim, and Christian people.

Haitian
According to the 2000 census, there are about 200,000 Haitians/Haitian Americans in Brooklyn, showing that it is home to the largest number of Haitian immigrants in New York City. The neighborhood that has the largest Haitian community in New York is Flatbush, Brooklyn. The 2010 US Census indicates that 3% of Brooklynites are of Haitian descent.  On Flatbush Avenue, Nostrand Avenue and Church Avenue it is possible to find Haitian businesses and restaurants. Other prominent Haitian neighborhoods include East Flatbush, Canarsie, and Kensington in Brooklyn and Springfield Gardens, Queens Village, and Cambria Heights in Queens.

Jamaican

New York State has the largest population of Jamaican Americans in the United States. About 3.5% of the population of Brooklyn is of Jamaican heritage. In 1655, Jamaica was captured by the British, who brought African slaves in large numbers to work on plantations.  The African slaves were emancipated in 1838, and owners starting paying wages to workers, who were now free to immigrate to the United States.  Many Jamaicans immigrated in the years following 1944, when the United States economy was rebuilding from World War II, seeing opportunity.  After 1965, when immigration quotas were lifted, Jamaican immigration skyrocketed again.

Jamaican neighborhoods include Queens Village and Jamaica in Queens; Crown Heights, East Flatbush, Flatbush in Brooklyn, and Wakefield, Williamsbridge and Tremont in the Bronx.

South and East Asian

Bangladeshi
, there are more than 74,000 Bangladeshis in New York City, a majority of whom reside in the boroughs of Queens and Brooklyn. The Bangladeshis in New York tend to form enclaves in neighborhoods predominantly populated by Asian Indians. These enclaves include one in Kensington, Brooklyn, featuring Bangladeshi grocers, hairdressers, and halal markets. Kensington's enclave was formed in the mid-1990s as a small community of Bangladeshi shops. Bangladeshis have tried to leave a permanent legacy, making a failed attempt to rename McDonald Avenue after Sheikh Mujibur Rahman, the first president of Bangladesh which was not backed by the surrounding residents of that area, they however within themselves have nicknamed the area Bangla Town.

The largest Bangladeshi enclave is on 73rd Street in Jackson Heights, Queens, which they share with the Indian, Pakistani and Filipinos of that area. As well as one on Hillside Avenue in Queens, and one in Parkchester, Bronx. As well as living alongside the Indians, Bangladeshis own many of the Indian restaurants in Brooklyn and Queens.

Chinese

Until the late 20th century, the Chinese population was limited to one area in lower Manhattan. The New York metropolitan area contains the largest ethnic Chinese population outside of Asia, enumerating an estimated 735,019 individuals , including at least 350,000 foreign born Chinese , making them the city's second largest ethnic group. The Chinese population in the New York City area is dispersed across at least 9 Chinatowns, comprising the original Manhattan Chinatown, three in Queens (the Flushing Chinatown, the Elmhurst Chinatown, and the newly emerged Chinatown in Corona), three in Brooklyn (the Sunset Park Chinatown, the Avenue U Chinatown, and the new Bensonhurst Chinatown), and one each in Edison, New Jersey and Nassau County, Long Island, not to mention fledgling ethnic Chinese enclaves emerging throughout the New York City metropolitan area. Chinese Americans, as a whole, have had a (relatively) long tenure in New York City. New York City's satellite Chinatowns in Queens and Brooklyn are thriving as traditionally urban enclaves, as large-scale Chinese immigration continues into New York.

Manhattan

The first Chinese immigrants came to lower Manhattan around 1870, looking for the "gold" America had to offer.  By 1880, the enclave around Five Points was estimated to have from 200 to as many as 1,100 members.  However, the Chinese Exclusion Act, which went into effect in 1882, caused an abrupt decline in the number of Chinese who immigrated to New York and the rest of the United States.  Later, in 1943, the Chinese were given a small quota, and the community's population gradually increased until 1968, when the quota was lifted and the Chinese American population skyrocketed. Today, the Manhattan Chinatown is home to the largest concentration of Chinese people in the Western Hemisphere and is one of the oldest ethnic Chinese enclaves outside of Asia. Within Manhattan's expanding Chinatown lies a "Little Fuzhou" on East Broadway and surrounding streets, occupied predominantly by immigrants from the Fujian Province of Mainland China. Areas surrounding the "Little Fuzhou" consist mostly of Cantonese immigrants from Guangdong Province, the earlier Chinese settlers, and in some areas moderately of Cantonese immigrants. In the past few years, however, the Cantonese dialect that has dominated Chinatown for decades is being rapidly swept aside by Mandarin, the national language of China and the lingua franca of most of the latest Chinese immigrants. The energy and population of Manhattan's Chinatown are fueled by relentless, massive immigration from Mainland China, both legal and illegal in origin, propagated in large part by New York's high density, extensive mass transit system, and huge economic marketplace.

The early settlers of Manhattan's Chinatown were mostly from Hong Kong and from Taishan of the Guangdong Province of China, which are Cantonese-speaking, and also from Shanghai.  They form most of the Chinese population of the area surrounded by Mott and Canal Streets.  The later settlers, from Fuzhou, Fujian, form the Chinese population of the area bounded by East Broadway.  Chinatown's modern borders are roughly Grand Street on the north, Broadway on the west, Chrystie Street on the east, and East Broadway to the south. Little Fuzhou, a prime destination status for immigrants from the Fujian Province of China, is another, Fuzhouese, enclave in Chinatown and the Lower East Side of Manhattan. Manhattan's Little Fuzhou is centered on the street of East Broadway. The neighborhood is named for the western portion of the street, which is primarily populated by mainland Chinese immigrants, (primarily Foochowese from Fuzhou, Fujian). The smaller, eastern portion has traditionally been home to a large number of Jews,  Puerto Ricans, and African Americans.

Queens

The present Flushing Chinatown, in the Flushing area of the borough of Queens, was predominantly non-Hispanic white and Japanese until the 1970s when Taiwanese began a surge of immigration, followed by other groups of Chinese. By 1990, Asians constituted 41% of the population of the core area of Flushing, with Chinese in turn representing 41% of the Asian population. However, ethnic Chinese are constituting an increasingly dominant proportion. A 1986 estimate by the Flushing Chinese Business Association approximated 60,000 Chinese in Flushing alone. The popular styles of Chinese cuisine are ubiquitously accessible in Flushing Chinatown, including Taiwanese, Shanghainese, Hunanese, Sichuanese, Cantonese, Fujianese, Xinjiang, Zhejiang, and Korean Chinese cuisine. Even the relatively obscure Dongbei style of cuisine indigenous to Northeast China is now available in Flushing Chinatown, as well as Mongolian cuisine. Mandarin Chinese (including Northeastern Mandarin), Fuzhou dialect, Min Nan Fujianese, Wu Chinese, Beijing dialect, Wenzhounese, Shanghainese, Suzhou dialect, Hangzhou dialect, Changzhou dialect, Cantonese, Taiwanese, and English are all prevalently spoken in Flushing Chinatown, while the Mongolian language is now emerging.

Elmhurst, another neighborhood in Queens, also has a large and growing Chinese community.

Brooklyn

By 1988, 90% of the storefronts on Eighth Avenue in Sunset Park, in southern Brooklyn, had been abandoned. Chinese immigrants then moved into this area, not only new arrivals from China, but also members of Manhattan's Chinatown, seeking refuges from high rents, who fled to the cheap property costs and rents of Sunset Park and formed the Brooklyn Chinatown, which now extends for 20 blocks along Eighth Avenue, from 42nd to 62nd Streets. This relatively new but rapidly growing Chinatown located in Sunset Park was originally settled by Cantonese immigrants like Manhattan's Chinatown in the past, but is now being repopulated by Fujianese (including Fuzhou people) and Wenzhounese immigrants.

Another Chinatown has developed in southern Brooklyn, on Avenue U in the Homecrest area, as evidenced by the growing number of Chinese-run fruit markets, restaurants, beauty and nail salons, and computer and general electronics dealers, spread among a community formerly composed mainly of Georgians, Vietnamese, Italians, Russians, and Greeks. The population of Homecrest in 2013 was more than 40% Chinese. Also emerging in southern Brooklyn, in the Bensonhurst neighborhood, below the BMT West End Line along on 86th Street between 18th Avenue and Stillwell Avenue, is Brooklyn's third Chinatown. The second Chinatown and the third, emerging Chinatown of Brooklyn are now increasingly carrying the majority of the Cantonese population in Brooklyn as the Cantonese dissipate from the main Brooklyn Chinatown in Sunset Park. With the migration of the Cantonese in Brooklyn now to Bensonhurst, and along with new Chinese immigration, small clusters of Chinese people and businesses in different parts of Bensonhurst have grown integrating with other ethnic groups and businesses. Smaller enclaves also exist in nearby Dyker Heights, Gravesend, and Bath Beach.

Filipino

In Woodside, Queens, 13,000 out of 85,000 (~15%) of the population is Filipino.  Woodside's "Little Manila" extends along Roosevelt Avenue.

The first Filipino settlement in the United States was Saint Malo, Louisiana, established in 1763.  Mass immigration started in the late 19th century, to service the plantations of Hawaii and the farms of California.  The immigration quota was lowered to 50 Filipinos a year, however, Filipinos in the United States Navy were exempt from this.  Therefore, Filipinos settled near naval bases and formed ethnic enclaves due to discrimination.  The quota was raised in the second half of the 20th century, starting another wave of Filipino immigration, looking for political freedom and opportunity, and one which has extended until present.

Myanmar
The Myanmar culture is very vibrant. However, there is not a large population of Burmese people in New York City.  The Myanmar community is spread throughout the five boroughs of New York City.

Indian

Indian Americans are another group that has settled in New York City, forming a few different ethnic enclaves.  One of these is called "Curry Row" and is in the East Village, Manhattan, centered on 6th Street between 1st and 2nd Avenues, another is called "Curry Hill" or "Little India", centered on Lexington Avenue between 26th and 31st Streets, and another is in Jackson Heights, Queens, centered on 74th Street between Roosevelt and 37th Avenue.

Richmond Hill, Queens is another "Little India" community. This area has the largest Sikh population in the New York City area. It is also known as "Little Punjab". There is also a "Little Indo-Caribbean" community in Richmond Hill, Queens with many Indo-Caribbean Americans.

Some of the region's main centers of Indian culture are located in central New Jersey, particularly in Middlesex County. In Edison, New Jersey, ethnic Asian Indians represent more than 28% of the population, the highest percentage of any place in the United States with more than 1,000 residents identifying their ancestry. The Oak Tree Road area, which crosses through Edison and Iselin is a growing cultural hub with high concentrations of Indian stores and restaurants.

There have been three major waves of Indian immigrants, the first between 1899 and 1913, the second after India was granted independence from the United Kingdom in 1947, and the third after the immigration quota for individual countries was lifted in 1965. , the New York City metropolitan area contains the largest Asian Indian population in North America.

Japanese

As of the 2000 Census, over half of the 37,279 people of Japanese ancestry in New York State lived in New York City.

 within the city the largest groups of Japanese residents are in Astoria, Queens and Yorkville in the Upper East Side of Manhattan. As of the 2010 U.S. Census there are about 1,300 Japanese in Astoria and about 1,100 Japanese in Yorkville. 500 Japanese people lived in East Village. As of the same year, there are about 6,000 Japanese in Bergen County, New Jersey and 5,000 Japanese in Westchester County, New York. As of that year most short-term Japanese business executives in Greater New York City reside in Midtown Manhattan or in New York City suburbs. In 2011 Dolnick and Semple wrote that while other ethnic groups in the New York City region cluster in specific areas, the Japanese were distributed "thinly" and "without a focal point" such as Chinatown for the Chinese.

Korean

New York City is home to the second largest population of ethnic Koreans outside of Korea. Koreans started immigrating with the signing of the Korean-American Treaty of Amity and Commerce, which allowed them to do so freely.  The first wave of Korean immigration lasted from 1903 to 1905, when 7,000 Koreans came to the United States. After this first wave, the 1907 "Gentlemen's Agreement" of President Theodore Roosevelt restricted Korean immigration to the United States.  President Harry Truman repealed this in 1948.  and from 1951 to 1964, another wave of Koreans migrated to the United States, and a third wave lasted from 1969 to 1987.  As economic conditions improved in Korea, many Koreans chose to stay.

Korean communities in New York include Koreatown in Manhattan; Bedford Park in the Bronx as a small number, outplacing Puerto Ricans and Dominicans; and Sunnyside, Woodside, Elmhurst, Flushing, Murray Hill, Bayside, and Douglaston–Little Neck, in Queens. The Korean enclave in Flushing spread eastward across Queens and into Nassau County, forming a large Long Island Koreatown—. In Murray Hill—part of the large Long Island Koreatown—the station of the same name on the Long Island Rail Road is close to a row of Korean-owned businesses and a mainly Korean-speaking community; the neighborhood culminates with Meokjagolmok (Restaurant Street) with two dozen restaurants, bars, cafes, a bakery, and some karaoke establishments.

Pakistani
Pakistani Americans have a large presence in New York, with the city (along with New Jersey) hosting the largest Pakistani population of any region in the United States. The population of Pakistanis in New York City is estimated at around 54,335; they are settled primarily in the boroughs of Brooklyn (specifically the neighborhoods of Kensington and Midwood) and Queens (more specifically Jackson Heights and Fresh Meadows). These numbers make Pakistani Americans the fifth largest Asian American group in New York City. , more than 50,000 people of Pakistani descent were said to be living in New York City. This figure rises to between 60,000 and 70,000 when illegal immigrants are also included. Pakistani migration to New York has occurred heavily only since the past two to three decades, reflecting the history of Pakistani migration elsewhere in the country; "Little Pakistans" or ethnic enclaves populated by Pakistanis tend to be characterized and populated by other South Asian Americans as well, including Indians and thus are dominated by South Asian culture. Pakistani restaurants, grocery markets and halal shops are abound in such areas.

Sri Lankan
Many Sri Lankan people settle in Tompkinsville, Staten Island, which has one of the highest concentrations of Sri Lankans outside of their native country. More than 5,000 Sri Lankans live in Staten Island. The Sri Lankan commercial center is at the corner of Victory Boulevard and Cebra Avenue. They often hold festive New Year celebrations on Staten Island, including a traditional oil-lighting ceremony, live baila music, and competitive events like coconut-scraping and bun-eating contests.

Vietnamese
There is a community of Vietnamese at the Bowery in an area unofficially known as "Little Saigon".  The area is overshadowed by neighboring Chinatown in that it is relatively indistinguishable.  The area, however, is marked by an abundance of Vietnamese restaurants.

European
Many European ethnic groups have formed enclaves in New York. These include Albanian, Croatian, German, Scandinavian, Hungarian, Greek, Irish, Italian, Jewish (see Jewish enclaves in New York City), Polish, Russian, Serbian and Ukrainian. There are British and French expatriate communities in New York City.

Albanian
Albanians first immigrated to the United States from Southern Italy and Greece in the 1920s. Later, in the 1990s, after the fall of communism in Eastern Europe, many Albanians flocked to the United States. Two neighborhoods that became Albanian are Belmont and Pelham Parkway.

In April 2012, it was reported by the New York Times that 9,500 people in the Bronx identify themselves as Albanian. Many live near Pelham Parkway and Allerton Ave in the Bronx.

German

Germans starting immigrating to the United States in the 17th century, and until the late 19th century, when Germany was the country of origin for the largest number of immigrants to the United States.  In fact, Over one million Germans entered the United States in the 1850s alone.

German American ethnic enclaves in New York City include the now-defunct Little Germany, in Manhattan and the extant Yorkville, Manhattan.  Little Germany, or as it was called in German, Kleindeutschland, was positioned in the Lower East Side, around Tompkins Square, in what would later become known as Alphabet City. The General Slocum disaster in 1904 wiped out the social core of the neighborhood, and many Germans moved to Yorkville.  Yorkville, part of the Upper East Side, is bounded (roughly) by 79th Street to the south, 96th Street and Spanish Harlem to the north, the East River to the east, and Third Avenue to the west.  The main artery of the neighborhood, 86th Street, has been called the "German Broadway".  For much of the 20th century, Yorkville was inhabited by German and Hungarian Americans.

The Queens neighborhoods of Ridgewood and Glendale include small populations of Germans.  Ridgewood notably includes Gottschee expatriates from modern-day Slovenia.

Greek

Astoria, Queens, is home to the largest concentration of Greek Americans in New York.  Walking down a street in the 1970s, one would see Greek restaurants, Hellenic clubs, and many Greek-owned businesses.  Now, Astoria has become more diverse, with Mexican Americans, Colombian Americans, Pakistani Americans, and Russian Americans all calling Astoria home, among others.  Many Greeks are leaving Astoria for Whitestone, Queens, but many of the buildings in Astoria are still owned by Greeks.

Through the 1950s, most Greek New Yorkers lived in Manhattan. With a surge in Greek immigration in the 1960s, Astoria emerged as New York City's "Greektown." Between 1965 and 1975, about 150,000 Greek immigrants settled in the United States, with the majority settling in New York City.  With most migrating for the economic opportunity, but as living conditions in Greece improved in the 1980s, Greek migration slowed.  However, Astoria remains New York's "Greektown."

Hungarian

There is a significant orthodox Jewish Hungarian population in the rapidly growing neighborhood of Borough Park, Brooklyn. In December 2012, the stretch of 13th Avenue from 36th to 60th Streets was co-named Raoul Wallenberg Way in honor of the Swedish diplomat who saved 100,000 Hungarian Jews during the Holocaust. Many of these survivors settled in Borough Park after the war and raised their families here. There is also a Hungarian population in Williamsburg, Brooklyn and an affluent population in Yorkville, Manhattan.

Irish

Irish Americans make up approximately 5.3% of New York City's population, composing the second largest non-Hispanic white ethnic group.  Irish Americans first came to America in colonial years (pre-1776), with immigration rising in the 1820s due to poor living conditions in Ireland.  But the largest wave of Irish immigration came after the Great Famine in 1845.

After they came, Irish immigrants often crowded into subdivided homes, only meant for one family, and cellars, attics, and alleys all became home for some Irish immigrants.  In fact, New York once had more Irish people than Dublin itself. The Irish in New York developed a particular reputation for joining the New York City Police Department as well as the New York Fire Department.

This traditional connection between the Irish-American population and these services is reflected in the continued presence of Emerald Societies that serve as fraternal associations for law enforcement, fire service, and non-uniform civil service agencies.

Bay Ridge, Brooklyn, was originally developed as a resort for wealthy Manhattanites in 1879, but instead became a family-oriented Italian- and Irish-American community.  Another large Irish-American community is located in Woodlawn Heights, Bronx, but Woodlawn Heights also has a mix of different ethnic groups. One large Irish community in Manhattan was Hell's Kitchen.  Other sizable Irish-American communities include Belle Harbor and Breezy Point, both in Queens. Two big Irish communities are Marine Park and neighboring Gerritsen Beach. Another large Irish community can be found on the North Shore of Staten Island in the West Brighton area.

The annual New York City St. Patrick's Day Parade, with over 150,000 participants and 2,000,000 spectators, is a testament to the enduring Irish-American community in New York City that continues to maintain a strong connection to their heritage and culture.

Italian

At 8.3% of the population, Italian Americans compose the largest European American ethnic group in New York City, and are the largest ethnic group in Staten Island (Richmond County), making it the most Italian county in the United States, with 37.7% of the population reporting Italian American ancestry.

Though Italian immigration began as early as the 17th century, with Pietro Cesare Alberti, from Venice, being the first reported Italian living in the New Amsterdam colony, effective immigration started around 1860 with the founding of the Kingdom of Italy. Italian immigration skyrocketed, and lasted that way until 1921, when Congress passed the Emergency Quota Act that slowed the immigration of Italians.  Most of the Italian immigrants to New York were from Southern Italy, from cities, Sicily, or Naples.

At one time, Little Italy in Manhattan had over 40,000 Italians and covered seventeen blocks. In fact, much of the Lower East Side in general and, until recently, Greenwich Village contained a high Italian population. Increasing rent prices, gentrification, and the enlargement of Chinatown have resulting in the shrinking of Little Italy. Little Italy is now concentrated around Mulberry Street between Kenmare and Grand streets, with about 5,000 Italian Americans. Italian Harlem, which was once home to over 100,000 Italian-Americans, has also largely disappeared since the 1970s, with the exception of Pleasant Avenue. East New York, Flatbush, Brooklyn, and Brownsville, Brooklyn also had sizable Italian communities that gradually shrank by the 1970s, though pockets of the older Italian-American communities still exist in these neighborhoods.

Another wave of immigration occurred after World War II, with an estimated 129,000 to 150,000 Italian immigrants entering New York City between 1945 and 1973.  They settled in Italian American neighborhoods in the outer boroughs and helped reinvigorate Italian culture and community institutions.  With the influx of postwar immigrants, Bensonhurst became the largest Italian community in New York City, with 150,000 Italian Americans in the 1980 census.

Today, Italian neighborhoods with large Italian-American populations include Morris Park, Bronx; Fordham, Bronx, around Arthur Avenue; Country Club, Bronx; Pelham Bay, Bronx; Little Italy, Bronx, Bay Ridge, Brooklyn; Bensonhurst, Brooklyn; Williamsburg, Brooklyn and East Williamsburg; Dyker Heights, Brooklyn, the city's largest Italian neighborhood (as of 2009); Cobble Hill, Brooklyn and Carroll Gardens, Brooklyn; Canarsie, Brooklyn; Astoria, Howard Beach, Middle Village, Whitestone and Ozone Park, Queens; and much of Staten Island.

Scandinavian

Lapskaus Boulevard in Bay Ridge, Brooklyn recalls a Norwegian enclave, which became mostly assimilated in the late 20th century. At its peak the area was home to 60,000 Norwegians. In addition, Bay Ridge was also home to many Swedish and Danish immigrants. Other enclaves with notable Scandinavian populations include Sunset Park and Dyker Heights, Brooklyn. The Northeast area of the Bronx, namely the Throggs Neck and Castle Hill sections, also had sizeable populations. In the Southwestern Bronx, many Swedes settled in the Morrisania area. In Manhattan, Scandinavians were scattered throughout the borough. The Finnish immigrants had two enclaves in the city. The first was in East Harlem, where they lived alongside poor Irish, Italians, Germans and Jews. Many Finnish businesses could be found along 125th Street, between Fifth Avenue and the Harlem River. Due to social mobility, in the early 20th century, many Finns relocated to Sunset Park. This enclave would contain the largest number of Finns in New York. The Finns were responsible for building many cooperative housing structures in the area. These would also be the first Co-Op buildings built in the United States. Despite the waning presence of Finns in Sunset Park, in 1991, 40th street was co named as "Finlandia Street, to honor the thousands of Finnish immigrants that called Brooklyn home. 

There is a "Sweden Day", a midsummer celebration honoring Swedish American heritage and history. Since 1941, it has been held annually at Manhem Club, located in the Throggs Neck area of the Bronx. There are many smaller celebrations held in other boroughs, as well as New Jersey.

Nordic heritage is still apparent in some sections of the Bay Ridge neighborhood. There is an annual Syttende Mai Parade, celebrated in honor of Norwegian Constitution Day. The parade features hundreds of people in folk dress who march along Fifth Avenue. The parade ends with the crowning of Miss Norway near the statue of Leif Ericson. The monument was donated in 1939 by Crown Prince Olav,  and features a replica of a Viking rune stone located in Tune, Norway. The stone stands on Leif Ericson Square just east of Fourth Avenue

Polish
Polish American communities in New York include Greenpoint ("Little Poland") and North Williamsburg in Brooklyn, Maspeth, the East Village near 7th Street, and Ridgewood, Queens around both Fresh Pond Road and Forest Avenue, in Queens.

Russian

Brooklyn has several Russian American communities, including Bay Ridge, Gravesend, Sheepshead Bay, and Midwood. Staten Island's Russian American communities are in South Beach, and New Dorp. The largest Russian-speaking community in the United States is Brighton Beach.  Many Russians in New York are Jews from the former Soviet Union, which broke up in 1991, and most still retain at least part of their Russian culture.  The primary language of Brighton Beach is Russian, as seen from businesses, clubs, and advertisements.  A significant portion of the community is not proficient in English, and about 98% speak Russian as their native language.

Serbian

The strength of the Serbian community in New York is estimated at around 40,000, with the largest concentrations in Ridgewood and Astoria . Whereas the Serbian Orthodox Cathedral of St. Sava on 26th Street in Manhattan provides a historical link to the first Serbian immigrants, these days Serbs are concentrated in Queens, mainly in Ridgewood, Glendale, and Astoria, although the Serbian Club is located on 65th Place in Glendale.

Spanish
Little Spain was a Spanish-American neighborhood in Manhattan during the 20th century. It was on 14th Street, between Seventh and Eighth Avenues.

Ukrainian

There is a small Ukrainian American community in the East Village, centered on Second Avenue between 6th and 10th Streets. The community was there when the East Village was still referred to as the Lower East Side, and was a moderately large community.  Though it has since declined, the number of Ukrainians in the neighborhood may have been as high as 60,000 after World War II.

Latin American

Many ethnic enclaves in New York City are Latin American-centric.  Latin American ethnic groups with enclaves in New York include Argentinians, Brazilians, Colombians, Dominicans, Peruvians, Salvadorans, Ecuadorians, Haitians, Guatemalans, Mexicans, and Puerto Ricans.

More than half of the population of Jackson Heights, Queens, are immigrants, primarily South Asians, and Latin Americans, including Argentinians, Colombians, and Uruguayans.

Most Brazilian Americans in New York can be found in two areas—in Astoria, Queens, and on a section of West 46th Street between Fifth Avenue and Sixth Avenue in Midtown Manhattan. In Astoria, the area around 36th Avenue and 30th Street is the most Brazilian in character, despite the prevalence of other ethnic groups, like Bengali, Pakistani, Indian, Mexican, Arab, Japanese, Korean, Greek, Dominican, and Italian people. The top three languages in Astoria are Bengali, Spanish, and Brazilians' native Portuguese.  The other Brazilian neighborhood, 46th Street between Fifth and Sixth Avenues, was officially named "Little Brazil", but resident Brazilians call it "Rua 46."

One of many Latin American groups represented in New York, Colombian Americans have a very strong presence in Jackson Heights and a nearby neighborhood, Elmhurst, especially along Roosevelt Avenue.

New York City also has some Salvadoran American ethnic enclaves such as the one in Flushing; others are in Corona, Jamaica, Williamsburg, and Parkchester. There is a sizable Honduran American population in the South and West Bronx.

Dominican

Immigration records of Dominicans in the United States date from the late 19th century, with New York City having a Dominican community since the 1930s. Large scale immigration of Dominicans began after 1961 onward when dictator Rafael Trujillo died.  Other catalysts in Dominican immigration were the invasion of Santo Domingo in 1965, and the regime of Joaquín Balaguer from 1966 to 1978.  In part due to these catalysts, starting in the 1970s and lasting until the early 1990s, Dominicans were the largest group of immigrants coming into New York City.  Now, Dominicans compose 7% of New York's population and are the largest immigrant group.  Major Dominican neighborhoods in New York include Washington Heights and Inwood in Manhattan, Bushwick, Southside Williamsburg, Sunset Park, and East New York in Brooklyn, Corona, Jackson Heights, Ridgewood, and Woodhaven in Queens, and most of the West Bronx, particularly areas like the Highbridge, University Heights, Morris Heights, Kingsbridge, and Fordham-Bedford, among others. In fact, Dominicans are the most dominant Hispanic group (and overall ethnic group) in many areas of the Bronx west of Third Avenue, often sharing these Bronx neighborhoods with Puerto Ricans, African Americans, as well as whites and other immigrants from Latin America and Africa. Upper Manhattan and western portions of the Bronx have some of the highest concentrations of Dominicans in the country.

The South Bronx is another neighborhood with a Dominican population.  During the 1970s, the area, while heavily populated by Puerto Ricans & African Americans, became infamous for poverty and arson, a lot by landlords seeking insurance money on "coffin ships" of buildings.  By 1975, the South Bronx was the most devastated urban landscape in America, and had experienced the largest population drop in urban history, given the exception of the aftermath of war.  The South Bronx has started to recover, and most of it has recovered from the damage done in the 1970s.

By 1984, the traditionally heavily Italian neighborhood of Corona had instead become heavily Dominican, and Corona experienced rapid economic growth – 59% – as compared to the rest of the city experiencing 7%, as well as having the most overcrowded school district in the city .

The Dominican population of Washington Heights is significant, and candidates for political office in the Dominican Republic will run parades up Broadway.

In some of these neighborhoods, shops advertise in Spanish and English, the Dominican flag is hung from windows, storefronts, and balconies, and the primary language is Dominican Spanish.

Ecuadorian

New York City has a large Ecuadorian American ethnic enclaves, and there are over 210,000 Ecuadorians in the city , making them the sixth largest ethnic population in the city. A part of Southside Williamsburg in Brooklyn is Ecuadorian in nature, with Spanish being the primary language of most Ecuadorians in the area, bodegas advertising goods in Spanish, and churches advertising bingo games in Spanish.

Other Ecuadorian neighborhoods include Tremont in the Bronx, and several neighborhoods in Queens, including Jackson Heights, Corona, and Ridgewood, have significant Ecuadorian communities. Corona's Ecuadorian community, notably, is the fastest-growing, with parts of Corona being over 25% Ecuadorian.

Mexican
Mexican Americans, were New York's fastest growing ethnic group, with 186,000 immigrants ; they were also the third largest Hispanic group in New York City, after Puerto Ricans and Dominicans. Close to 80% of New York Mexicans were born outside the United States, and more than 60% of Mexican New Yorkers reside in Brooklyn and Queens.

In Brooklyn, Sunset Park and Flatbush have the highest concentration of Mexicans, and Bushwick and Brighton Beach also have significant Mexican populations. In Queens, Elmhurst, East Elmhurst, and Jackson Heights have the largest Mexican populations, but Corona and Kew Gardens also have sizable communities. Spanish Harlem in Manhattan, around 116th Street and Second Avenue, has a large community of Mexicans, which is still small compared to the area's predominant Puerto Rican population; Staten Island has a large Mexican community in the Port Richmond, West Brighton, and Tompkinsville areas.

The densest population of Mexicans in the city is in Sunset Park, Brooklyn, in an area bounded by Second and Fifth Avenues and by 35th and 63rd Streets. This area is centered around a Fifth Avenue commercial strip. The main church is Basilica of Our Lady of Perpetual Help, with over 3,000 Mexican Catholic parishioners.

Compared to Mexican immigrants in other states and cities, Mexicans in New York are primarily of indigenous descent, with almost 20% still speaking indigenous languages. New York holds 61% of indigenous-speaking immigrants from Mexico.

Puerto Rican

Puerto Ricans have been immigrating to New York since 1838, though they did not arrive in large numbers until the 20th century. In 1910 only 500 Puerto Ricans lived in New York, but by 1970 that number had skyrocketed to over 800,000, and 40% of those lived in the Bronx. The first group of Puerto Ricans immigrated to New York City in the mid-19th century when Puerto Rico was a Spanish colony and its people Spanish subjects and as such they were immigrants. The following wave of Puerto Ricans to move to New York City did so after the Spanish–American War in 1898. Puerto Ricans were no longer Spanish subjects and citizens of Spain, they were now Puerto Rican citizens of an American possession and needed passports to travel to the mainland of the United States. That was until 1917, when the United States Congress approved Jones-Shafroth Act which gave Puerto Ricans in the island a U.S. citizenship with certain limitations. Puerto Ricans living in the mainland U.S. however,  were given full American citizenship and were allowed to seek political office in the states which they resided. Two months later, when Congress passed the Selective Service Act, conscription was extended to the Puerto Ricans both in the island and in the U.S. mainland. It was expected that Puerto Rican men 18 years and older serve in the military during World War I. The Jones-Shafroth Act also allowed Puerto Ricans to travel between Puerto Rico and the United States mainland without the need of a passport, thereby becoming migrants. The advent of air travel was one of the principal factors that led to the largest wave of migration of Puerto Ricans to New York City in the 1950s, known as "The Great Migration". Although Florida has received some dispersal of the population, there has been a resurgence in Puerto Rican migration to New York and New Jersey - consequently, the New York City Metropolitan Area has witnessed an increase in its Puerto Rican population from 1,177,430 in 2010 to a Census-estimated 1,201,850 in 2012, maintaining its status by a significant margin as the most important cultural and demographic center for Puerto Ricans outside San Juan.

Brooklyn has several neighborhoods with a Puerto Rican presence, many of the ethnic Puerto Rican neighborhoods in Brooklyn formed before the Puerto Rican neighborhoods in the South Bronx because of the work demand in the Brooklyn Navy Yard in the 1940s and 50s. Bushwick has the highest concentration of Puerto Ricans in Brooklyn. Other neighborhoods with significant populations include Williamsburg, East New York, Brownsville, Coney Island, Red Hook, Sunset Park, and Bay Ridge. In Williamsburg; Graham Avenue is nicknamed "Avenue of Puerto Rico" because of the high density and strong ethnic enclave of Puerto Ricans who have been living in the neighborhood since the 1950s. The Puerto Rican day parade is also hosted on the avenue.

Ridgewood, Queens, also has a significant Puerto Rican population, which is now spreading to other places in Central Queens such as Maspeth, Glendale, and Middle Village; as does neighboring community Bushwick, Brooklyn. Other neighborhoods in Queens such as Woodhaven also have a sizable population.

Puerto Rican neighborhoods in Manhattan include Spanish Harlem and Loisaida. Spanish Harlem was "Italian Harlem" from the 1880s until the 1940s. By 1940, however, the name "Spanish Harlem" was becoming widespread, and by 1950, the area was predominantly Puerto Rican and African American. Loisaida is an enclave east of Avenue A that originally comprised German, Jewish, Irish, and Italian working class residents who lived in tenements without running water; the German presence, already in decline, virtually ended after the General Slocum disaster in 1904. Since them, the community has become Puerto Rican and Latino in character, despite the "gentrification" that has affected the East Village and the Lower East Side since the late 20th century.

Staten Island has a fairly large Puerto Rican population along the North Shore, especially in the Mariners' Harbor, Arlington, Elm Park, Graniteville, Port Richmond & Stapleton neighborhoods, where the population is in the 20% range.

Unlike the other four boroughs, Puerto Rican populations are significant throughout the Bronx, though there is slightly higher concentrations in the South Bronx. Bronx neighborhoods with the highest concentrations of Puerto Ricans in the borough, and some of the highest in the city overall, mainly consist of low-income areas with high overall Hispanic percentages, especially in the southwest (South Bronx) and south central sections of the Bronx, because these are areas Puerto Ricans first started moving to when Puerto Rican migration to the Bronx started in the 1960s, due to proximity to Spanish Harlem, areas like Mott Haven, Melrose, Longwood, and Soundview. Puerto Ricans are scattered in sizeable numbers throughout the Bronx, and better-off Puerto Ricans can be seen in more middle-class neighborhoods like Throggs Neck and Riverdale for example. Nearly 40% of NYC Puerto Ricans live in the Bronx.

In New York and many other cities, Puerto Ricans usually live in close proximity with Dominicans and African Americans. High concentrations of Puerto Ricans are also present in numerous public housing developments throughout the city.

In some places in the South Bronx, Spanish is the primary language. Throughout the 1970s, the South Bronx became known as the epitome of urban decay, but has since made a recovery.

Middle Eastern

Arabs 
Several Middle Eastern ethnic groups have immigrated to New York and formed several neighborhoods with a high concentration of people who are of Arab descent. 
Between the 1870s and the 1920s, the first wave of Arab immigrants brought mostly Syrians and Lebanese people to NYC. The majority of them were Christian. A lot of the Syrian immigrants settled on Washington Street. In this area, the first Arabic neighborhood was formed. During the second immigration wave in the '60s, Little Syria became more affluent and moved to the area around Atlantic Avenue. After a certain period, the Arab inhabitants of this area moved to other parts of the city, such as Astoria and Bay Ridge. There are now around 160,000 Arabs in NYC and more than 480,000 in New York State. According to the Arab American Institute the population of people who identify themselves as Arab, grew by 23% between 2000 and 2008.

Bronx

Located on White Plains Road in Morris Park the area has been recently named Little Yemen due to the growing number of Yemeni Americans. The area contains several Hookah cafes, a Yemeni supermarket, and Yemeni delis and pharmacies that surround the intersection.

Queens 
Astoria, Queens, has an Egyptian American community, dubbed "Little Egypt", centered on Steinway Street between Broadway and Astoria Boulevard.  It features many Middle Eastern and North African cafés, restaurants, and shops, including other businesses from countries like  Algeria, Lebanon, and Syria.

Brooklyn 
On Atlantic Avenue between the East River and Flatbush Avenue, there is also a significant population of Middle Easterners. There are a few shops which still exist in this street, such as Sahadi's. A little part of this community remained in the neighborhoods Boerum Hill and Park Slope.
There is also a significant Middle Eastern population in Midwood, Brooklyn and Bay Ridge, Brooklyn.
Especially Bay Ridge has a dramatically growing concentration of Arabs. You can find a lot of Yemenis and Palestinians in this neighborhood.

Other boroughs:
Staten Island has a Palestinian community, found in the New Springville area.
There are a lot of Arab restaurants in Manhattan.

See Arab Americans & Arab immigration to the United States.

North Williamsburg is an ethnic enclave centered on Israeli Americans. There is also a small community of Israelis centered on Kings Highway, also in Brooklyn.  Israelis first immigrated to the United States after 1948. United Kingdom, and the United States has experienced two large waves of immigration from Israel.  The first was during the 1950s and early 1960s, 300,000 Israelis immigrated to the United States, and another wave, starting in the mid-1970s and lasting through the present, in which 100,000 to 500,000 Israelis have immigrated to the United States.

Armenians and Iranians 
The main concentration of Armenians including Armenian Americans and Iranian Americans of Armenian and Persian descent is in Queens, an estimated 50,000 people of the city's over 100,000 Armenians.

Religious enclaves

Jewish 

The first Jews arrived in New York City in 1654, when it was still New Amsterdam, from Recife (Brazil) following the First Anglo-Dutch War, resulting a decade later in the first known civil rights case in the New World when a Jew named Asser Levy successfully appealed to the New Amsterdam colonial council for the right to serve in the army.  Later German immigration brought large communities of Jews to the city.  Starting then until 1820 was the first wave of Jewish immigration to America, bringing fewer than 15,000 Jews. The first wave of Jewish people were fleeing religious persecution in Brazil, Portugal, Spain, Bordeaux, Jamaica, England, Curaçao, Holland, and conquered by Russian Empire former Poland (Rzeczpospolita Obojga Narodów), and founded communities in New York, Newport, Charleston, Savannah, and Philadelphia.  From 1820 to 1880 came the second wave, in which a quarter million German Jews migrated to America.  A third major wave of Sephardi Jews coming from the Balkans and the Middle East after the Turkish revolution.  The outbreak of World War I and the Holocaust caused many German Jews to immigrate to the United States.  During this period, 1881 to 1924, over 2,000,000 Eastern European Jews immigrated, fleeing anti-semitic persecution in their home countries.  A later wave from Eastern Europe, from 1985 to 1990, over 140,000 Jews immigrated from the former Soviet Union.  50,000 Jews a year still immigrate to the United States.

New York today has the second largest number of Jews in a metropolitan area, behind Gush Dan (the Tel Aviv Metropolitan Area) in Israel. Borough Park, Brooklyn, (also known as Boro Park) is one of the largest Orthodox Jewish communities in the world. Crown Heights, Brooklyn, also has a large Orthodox Jewish community. Flatbush, Brooklyn, Riverdale, Bronx, Williamsburg, Brooklyn, Midwood, Brooklyn, Forest Hills, Queens, Kew Gardens Hills, Queens, Kew Gardens, Queens, Fresh Meadows, Queens and the Upper East Side, Washington Heights, Manhattan because of the proximity of the renowned Yeshiva U and Upper West Side, Manhattan, are also home to Jewish communities.  Another neighborhood, the Lower East Side, though presently known as a mixing pot for people of many nationalities, including German, Puerto Rican, Italian, and Chinese, was primarily a Jewish neighborhood. Although the Jewish community of Staten Island is dispersed throughout the Island, enclaves of Hasidic Jews are found in the Willowbrook, New Springville, Eltingville, and New Brighton areas.

See also
 Demographics of New York City
 Cuisine of New York City
 Racial and ethnic history of New York City
 District X, a fictional enclave

References

External links

Ethnic enclaves
Ethnic enclaves
Ethnic enclaves in New York (state)